Nicholas Carl Boynton (born January 14, 1979) is a Canadian former professional ice hockey defenceman who played 11 seasons in the National Hockey League (NHL) for the Boston Bruins, Phoenix Coyotes, Florida Panthers, Anaheim Ducks, Chicago Blackhawks and Philadelphia Flyers. Boynton was most recently the color analyst for the Arizona Coyotes radio broadcasts.

Playing career
Boynton grew up playing minor hockey in his hometown of Nobleton, Ontario with the NobleKing Knights. He played in the 1992 Quebec International Pee-Wee Hockey Tournament with the Richmond Hill-Vaughan Kings minor ice hockey team. He played bantam AAA with the Kings before signing as a 15-year-old with the Caledon Canadians Jr. A. club of the Metro Junior Hockey League in 1994–95. He was a standout for four seasons with the OHL's Ottawa 67's, finishing his junior career in 1998–99 with 59 points in 51 games.

Boynton was originally drafted by the Washington Capitals in the 1997 NHL Entry Draft. After failing to come to terms on a contract with the Capitals, Boynton was eligible to return to the draft, and he was subsequently selected in the 1999 NHL Entry Draft by the Boston Bruins. Boynton played for the Bruins until 2005–06.

His best season was 2003–04 when he registered 30 points. During the NHL lockout season of 2004–05, Boynton played for the Nottingham Panthers in the British Elite Ice Hockey League, memorably scoring the equalizing goal in the British Championship Grand Final. On June 26, 2006, he was traded to the Phoenix Coyotes in exchange for fellow defenceman Paul Mara.

After two seasons with the Coyotes Boynton was traded at the 2008 NHL Entry Draft along with Keith Ballard and a second round pick to the Florida Panthers for Olli Jokinen on June 20, 2008. In the 2008-09 season, Boynton regained his scoring touch and posted 21 points in 68 games for the Panthers. During the season on February 27, 2009, Boynton was sent home from a Panthers road trip and missed three games for disciplinary reasons, later revealed to be after an argument with coach Peter DeBoer.

On July 9, 2009, he signed a one-year contract with the Anaheim Ducks for the 2009-10 season. After playing in 42 games with the Ducks. Boynton was placed on waivers on February 1, 2010. He was then assigned to the Manitoba Moose of the AHL.

On March 2, 2010, he was traded to the Chicago Blackhawks, he was then assigned to AHL affiliate, the Rockford IceHogs. Boynton was later recalled to the Blackhawks and made his debut in a 4–2 loss to the Ducks on March 17, 2010.  On June 9, 2010, he won his first Stanley Cup with the Chicago Blackhawks.

On February 26, 2011, Boynton was claimed off of waivers by the Philadelphia Flyers, with whom he played ten games to conclude the 2010–11 season. He retired after the season.

Personal life
Boynton married for the first time on August 3, 2012 to former Chicago media personality Jen Boynton (formerly Jen Patterson).  Boynton and his wife have two children together. Boynton also has two daughters from a previous relationship.

Shortly before his first NHL training camp, Boynton was diagnosed with Type I Diabetes, but the condition did not affect his ability to play hockey.

Boynton has spoken about the mental and emotional aspects and repercussions of playing hockey in the NHL.

Career statistics

Awards and honours

References

External links

 

1979 births
Anaheim Ducks players
Boston Bruins draft picks
Boston Bruins players
Canadian ice hockey defencemen
Canadian people of English descent
Chicago Blackhawks players
Florida Panthers players
Ice hockey people from Ontario
King City Secondary School alumni
Living people
Manitoba Moose players
National Hockey League All-Stars
National Hockey League first-round draft picks
Nottingham Panthers players
Ottawa 67's players
People with type 1 diabetes
Philadelphia Flyers players
Phoenix Coyotes players
Providence Bruins players
Rockford IceHogs (AHL) players
Stanley Cup champions
Washington Capitals draft picks
Sportspeople from King, Ontario
Canadian expatriate ice hockey players in England